Arotrophora obrimsocia is a species of moth of the family Tortricidae. It is found in Thailand and Assam, India.

The wingspan is 21–22 mm for males and 22–26 mm for females. The forewings are brownish with darker markings. The hindwings are pale brownish cream, with browner veins.

Etymology
The species name refers to the socius and is derived from Greek obrimos (meaning strong).

References

Moths described in 2009
Arotrophora
Moths of Asia